Princewill Ogbogbula (born 18 September 1970) is the current Commissioner of Youth Development in the Executive Council of Rivers State. He was appointed to the position in 2015 by Governor Ezenwo Nyesom Wike.

Early life and education
Born in Ubio Town in Ahoada West local government area, he obtained his West African Senior School Certificate in 1988 from Community Secondary School Erema. In 1995, he graduated from the University of Port Harcourt with a B.A. in Marketing. He then earned a Master of Business Administration from the Rivers State University of Science and Technology in 2000.

Career

Youth development
He joined the Wike Executive Council as Commissioner of Youth Development in December 2015.

Other offices held
Ogbobula has held other positions such as:
 LGA party chairman (Ahoada West PDP) group operations manager (Orashi Energy Nig Ltd) managing director – (Paun Nig Ltd)
 Market analyst and market development manager – Bonny Allied Industries Ltd (makers of Rock Cement)
 Marketing representative (south-south & southeast zones) – Bonny Allied Industries Ltd (makers of Rock Cement)
 Club manager – Air Assault Golf Club, Port Harcourt

See also
List of people from Rivers State
Youth empowerment

References

1970 births
Living people
People from Ahoada West
Rivers State Peoples Democratic Party politicians
Commissioners of ministries of Rivers State
First Wike Executive Council
Rivers State University alumni
Nigerian marketing people
University of Port Harcourt alumni